Kenneth James Mitchell (5 December 1924 – 14 December 1986) was an English first-class cricketer who played a single first-class match, for Worcestershire against Nottinghamshire at New Road in 1946. Batting at four, he made 0 and 10. He also took one catch, to dismiss Tom Reddick.

Mitchell was born in Old Hill, which was then in Staffordshire but is now in West Midlands.

External links
 

1924 births
1986 deaths
English cricketers
Worcestershire cricketers